Air Commodore Shirley Ann Jones  was director of the Women's Royal Air Force (WRAF) from 31 January 1986 to 1989.

References

Year of birth missing
Possibly living people
Commanders of the Order of the British Empire
Women's Royal Air Force officers